Bethany Jane Mead  (born 9 May 1995) is an English professional footballer who plays as a forward for the Women's Super League (WSL) club Arsenal and the England national team. A creative and prolific forward, she has all-time most assists and all-time second-most goal contributions in the WSL. At UEFA Women's Euro 2022, she became the Golden Boot winner, Player of the Tournament, and top assist provider, leading England to win a major tournament for the first time. Later that year, she was named BBC Sports Personality of the Year, becoming the first women's footballer to win the prestigious award; and finished runner-up for the Ballon d'Or and UEFA Player of the Year.

In 2015, Mead won the WSL Golden Boot and the WSL Player of the Year award, becoming the youngest WSL Golden Boot winner at the age of 20. It was only a season after leading her then-club Sunderland's promotion and WSL 2 title win. Having scored 77 goals in 78 games, she is regarded as one of the greatest players ever played for Sunderland.

Converted to a winger at Arsenal, Mead holds numerous WSL records in playmaking, including all-time most assists, most assists in a season, most chances created in a season, and most chances created from open play in a season. She was the WSL top assist provider in the 2018–19 and 2021–22 seasons. In the 2021–22 season, she was nominated for WSL Player of the Season. She won the 2018–19 WSL title with Arsenal.

Mead helped England reach the semi-final at the 2019 FIFA Women's World Cup, providing second-most assists in the tournament. In 2022, she broke Jimmy Greaves' 61-year-old record of the most goals scored in a season by an England player of either gender and was named BBC Women's Footballer of the Year and World Soccer World Player of the Year. She was appointed a Member of the Order of the British Empire (MBE) in the 2023 New Year Honours for her services to football.

Mead and her alma mater Teesside University launched Beth Mead Scholarship in February 2022 to support dual career students who have the potential to reach the professional level within women's football. Her Sunday Times bestseller autobiography, Lioness: My Journey to Glory, was published in November 2022.

Early life
Mead grew up in Hinderwell, a small village near Whitby, which she described as: "a fishing town in the middle of nowhere, with a population of about 2,000. [The] sort of place where the people are outnumbered by sheep. You know the type: loads of fields, two pubs, a hairdresser and about a mile away from the local shop."

Mead started playing football when she was six years old. Her mother wanted her to run off her boundless energy and took her to a Saturday morning football session on a village field in Hinderwell, which was run by a volunteer coach. He said to her and her mother, "It's fine that you're coming down to get involved but you will be the only girl here. They are quite rough so will she be ok?" Her mother replied, "She'll be fine." But when her mother came back an hour later, he said Mead was rougher than most of the boys. She played with the local boys on that bobbly community field as much as possible, regardless of which animals were on it or how long the grass was.

Mead took part in many sports, including cross-country running, netball, cricket, and field hockey, but "football always hit [her] different." She said: "I loved what I was doing on the pitch and had no other worry in the world — nothing else mattered except me kicking that football. Football is my first love; my one true love. It still breaks my heart sometimes, but that's part and parcel of the game. That's still my way of switching off now: just running around on a football pitch and loving what I’m doing. That’s never changed, from the six-year-old kid to the 27-year-old who's running around now." One day, Mead's local senior cricket team was one short. She joined in for the day and caught two balls from her brother's bowling. The local newspaper called it 'The Mead Show'.

Mead went to Oakridge Community Primary School in Hinderwell. There was no girls' football team at school, so she played for the boys' team. She was the only girl. However, the more she played, the more other girls wanted to join in. She was captain of the primary school team, and that made the other girls feel more comfortable, seeing she had been accepted and made captain. They won the local primary school cup for boys' teams with four girls in the team.

Club career

Early career
Mead began her youth career at California Boys FC and Middlesbrough centre of excellence at age nine. During her time playing for Middlesbrough academy, her mother picked up a second job to help cover the cost of petrol required for the twice-a-week 45-minute drive.

When Mead was playing at California Boys FC in the boys' league, the other team's players and parents would laugh when they saw her turn up because she was a girl. Her teammates used to tell the other team to laugh ahead of kick-off because they knew that as soon as the game started, she would be running rings around them. She minded neither because her dad told her, "While some people will always have opinions, and you would hear a few things, you don't need to say anything, and neither do I–your football will do the talking." After most games, she earned a lot of respect from teams and their parents for getting stuck in and playing well.

When Mead was just 13 or 14 at Middlesbrough academy, she scored a hat-trick against Sunderland, one of the best teams in England at the time, in six or seven minutes. As soon as she turned 16, Mick Mulhern, then-Sunderland manager, met her and her parents to sign her up for Sunderland. According to Mulhern, "she was a proper goalscorer, with either foot, from anywhere. When you think of someone at such a young, tender age, that I was so determined to sign her, it tells you what I thought of her then and what I knew she would become."

Sunderland, 2011–16

2011–13: Back-to-back WPL titles and Golden Boot awards
In 2011–12, her first season in the FA Women's Premier League (WPL), Mead scored 23 goals in as many games, and ended the season with 29 in all competitions. Sunderland won the league by Mead's winner against Leeds United. Sunderland won the FA Women's Premier League Cup for the first time, completing the double. Mead won the WPL Golden Boot, Sunderland Player of the Year award, and Mavis Clayton Memorial Trophy for Outstanding Achievement at the Scarborough and District Sports Awards.

In the 2012–13 season, Mead followed by 30 goals in 28 matches. She again won the FA WPL Golden Boot and Sunderland Player of the Year award. She was also named Top Female Achiever at the Scarborough and District Sports Awards.

2014: Leading Sunderland's promotion
In the 2014 WSL 2 season, Sunderland won the title and gained promotion to the WSL. Mead was the top scorer for the team. She was nominated for WSL 2 Player of the Year. She was named SportsByte Sports Person of the Year, Top Female Achiever at the Scarborough and District Sports Awards, and Sunderland Supporters' Young Player of the Year.

Although Mead turned professional upon Sunderland's promotion, she resolved to finish her final year at Teesside University. This inspired Mead and her alma mater to launch Beth Mead Scholarship in February 2022 to support dual career students who have the potential to reach professional, national or international level within women's football. She also kept working at her local pub. The landlord had sponsored her during the formative years of her career and she repaid the favour by working shifts behind the bar. So at one point, she was scoring the goals that secured Sunderland's promotion to the WSL, whilst studying for a degree and working as a barmaid.

2015–16: The youngest WSL Golden Boot winner
In her first match at the top level, Mead scored in Sunderland's shock 2–1 win over reigning champions Liverpool. On 19 July 2015, Mead scored a hat-trick against league leaders Chelsea, making her the league-leading scorer with eight goals. Earlier that week, Mead avoided injury despite rolling her car three times while trying to avoid a deer. The following week, she scored twice in a 4–1 win at Bristol, sending Sunderland to the top of the WSL. Her scoring 11 goals in the first ten games for Sunderland is the league record for most goals in the first ten appearances for a club.

Mead ended the 2015 season as the leading goalscorer in the WSL with 12 goals in 14 appearances. At the age of 20, she became the youngest WSL Golden Boot winner ever. Next best players scored 7 goals, only about half of Mead's goals. Sunderland finished at the fourth place. It was only a season after Sunderland's promotion and Sunderland's resources were far in arrears compared to the division’s heavyweights.

During this period, Jermain Defoe mentored the young striker. Women's team shared breakfast and lunch in the same canteen as the men's team. He heard about Mead being a great striker, so he wanted to know about her as he wasn't the only great striker at Sunderland. They got on well, talking about football every morning while he had green tea. He had watched Mead's goals and asked, "I’ve never scored one like that before. What were you thinking when you did that?" She would explain, but he understood that strikers have to be quite instinctive. They are quite similar characters – both outgoing and extroverted. The two bounced off each other. They have stayed in touch, and he has always supported her and shared his experience to help her with her career. In 2022, Defoe wrote an afterword to Mead's autobiography, Lioness: My Journey to Glory.

Besides the WSL Golden Boot, Mead was named WSL Player's Player of the Year, PFA Young Player of the Year, England Young Player of the Year, inaugural North East Football Writers' Association (FWA) Ladies Player of the Year, Sunderland Player of the Year, Sunderland Supporters' Player of the Year, SportsByte Sports Person of the Year, and Top Female Achiever at Scarborough and District Sports Awards; was nominated for PFA Players' Player of the Year; and was selected in the PFA Team of the Year.

Having scored 77 goals in 78 games, Mead is regarded as one of the best players ever played for Sunderland. Roker Report said: "The impact of Whitby lass Beth Mead on Sunderland Ladies in the mid-2010s was breathtaking. In five seasons from when, at the age of 16 in 2011, she broke into the side, she took first the Premier League North, then WSL 2 and finally the WSL 1 by storm, scoring 77 goals in 78 games as we rocketed up the pyramid, almost reaching the summit. Long standing fans of the Lasses had never quite seen anything like it, she was almost unplayable at times and her performances pushed Sunderland to the heights of a fourth place WSL 1 finish in 2015/16." Mead was named Sunderland Forward of the Decade and was selected in Sunderland Team of the Decade in 2019.

Arsenal, 2017–present

2017–18: Second England Young Player of the Year Award
On 24 January 2017, it was announced that Arsenal had signed Mead on an undisclosed-length full-time deal. She had resisted several offers from Arsenal since 2015 to finish her university degree in Sports Development. This inspired Mead and her alma mater Teesside University to launch Beth Mead Scholarship in February 2022 to support dual career students who have the potential to reach professional, national or international level within women’s football. At Arsenal, summer 2017 signing Vivianne Miedema soon occupied the centre-forward berth, so Mead had to play as a winger instead: "I'd played No. 9 all my career until I came to Arsenal. I was a bit annoyed that I wasn’t playing No. 9, because I thought that was my best position. But now I really enjoy playing on the wing. I can get involved, run at people, bring other people into play."

Arsenal won the 2017–18 FA Women's League Cup with Mead scoring in the knockout rounds against her former club Sunderland in the quarter-final and against Reading in the semi-final. Mead finished the 2017–18 season as Arsenal's top goalscorer in the league with eight goals. In 2018, Mead was named England Young Player of the Year for the second time, Football Supporters' Association (FSA) Player of the Year, and Arsenal Women Supporters Club Player of the Season; and selected in the PFA Team of the Year.

2018–19: WSL title and most assists in a season record
By the 2018–19 season, Mead had fully reinvented herself as a versatile winger under Joe Montemurro, which has seen her break the WSL record for the most assists in a season (12).

Moreover, Mead topped various creative statistics in the league, multiple of them with wide margins. She registered the highest assists per 90 (0.71, over 40% of 2nd place (0.51)), most carries into penalty area (42, over 45% of 2nd place (29)), highest xG assisted (6.6, over 14% of 2nd place (5.8)), most crosses into penalty area (19), and most shot-creating actions(96); 2nd most key passes (54), 2nd most passes into penalty area (43), 2nd most goal-creating actions (20), and 2nd highest goal-creating actions per 90 (1.18); 3rd highest shot-creating actions per 90 (5.69) and 3rd most fouls drawn (32).

Mead capped a great season off by scoring the third goal in Arsenal's 4–0 title-clinching win at Brighton & Hove Albion on 28 April 2019. The goal won the WSL Goal of the Season award. With 7 goals, Mead finished third in the WSL for total goal contributions (19), helping Arsenal win the WSL after a seven-year wait. Mead was nominated for the 2019 FSA Player of the Year. In addition, she was named WSL Player of the Month in March 2019 and April 2019.

2019–21: New long-term contract and the COVID-19 pandemic
Mead signed a new long-term contract with Arsenal on 28 November 2019. Mead suffered an injury during a 3–2 league win against Liverpool on 13 February 2020. A week later, Arsenal announced that she had injured her medial collateral ligament. The 2019–20 WSL season ended prematurely on 13 March 2020, due to the coronavirus pandemic.

Arsenal was the only WSL club to proceed to the 2019–20 UEFA Women's Champions League quarter-final. Mead scored the only Arsenal goal against Paris Saint-Germain in the quarter-final match on 28 August 2020.

On 15 November 2020, against the league champions Chelsea, Mead scored in the 86th minute of the 1–1 draw. In the 2020-21 season, Mead provided second-most assists in the WSL. She was also second highest in xG assisted (8.2) and through balls (7); third in fouls drawn (46) and xA per 90 (0.45).

2021–22: WSL all-time assists leader and Arsenal Player of the Season
In the 2021–22 season, Mead was the top assist provider (8) and scored third-most goals (11) in the WSL, helping Arsenal push in a title race that went down to the final day. Arsenal finished the season in second place, only a point less than the first. Arsenal was the only WSL team to proceed to the knockout stage in the 2021–22 UEFA Women's Champions League.

Mead set several WSL playmaking records in the season. She became the WSL all-time assists leader. She broke the record for most chances created in a season (72) and most chances created from open play in a season (54+), becoming the first player who created over 50 chances from open play.

Mead led the majority of creative statistics in the league, many of them by wide margins. She had the most chances created (72, over a half of 2nd place (48)), most big chances created (13, over 44% of 2nd place (9)), most key passes (65, over 30% of 2nd place (50)), most shot-creating actions (123, over a third of 2nd place (90)), highest shot-creating actions per 90 (6.43), most goal-creating actions (18), highest goal-creating actions per 90 (0.94, over 12% of 2nd place (0.84)), the highest xA (7.7), highest xG assisted (7.4), and most passes into penalty area (56); second highest successful dribbles per 90 (1.1), second most fouls drawn (41), and second highest progressive passes received (192).

With 14 goals and 19 assists in 34 starts, Mead's total goal contributions in the season came to 33. During the league opener against defending champions Chelsea, she scored a brace to defeat Chelsea 3–2. She was named Player of the Match. On 27 January 2022, Arsenal was behind Brighton & Hope Albion 0–1 after the first half. Just five minutes after the restart, Mead whipped an inch-perfect delivery across the face of the Brighton goal and Vivianne Miedema was well-placed to fire home from close range. Mead wasn't done there, though, and this time she went for goal herself with a free-kick on the edge of the area, firing a stunning curling effort into the top right corner to secure all three points. She was named Player of the Match. On 24 April 2022, Mead not only became the WSL all-time assist leader, but also reached the 50th goal in the WSL during Arsenal's 3–0 victory over Everton. Her assist resulted in teammate Jordan Nobbs' 50th WSL goal as well. She was named the Player of the Match.

Mead also established herself as the centrepiece of the pressing and counter-pressing system under new manager Jonas Eidevall. She topped the charts for pressing and defensive actions in the final third. She registered most pressures (381) and succeeded the most, made most tackles (61) and won the most (43), and made second-most blocks (32) in Arsenal. In the WSL, she won third most tackles. It is rare for a forward to achieve such numbers. On her counterpressing ability, manager Eidevall said: "I have never coached a player who is as fast at it (counterpressing) as Beth Mead. She can run 15 metres in seconds and close a player down."

Mead was named the FSA Player of the Year and nominated for the WSL Player of the Season and PFA Fan's Player of the Year. She won both the Arsenal Player of the Season award and Arsenal Women Supporters Club Player of the Season award by a landslide. Her other accolades include: GiveMeSportW Fans' WSL Player of the Season nominee, On Her Side WSL Player of the Season runner-up, The Athletic WSL Team of the Year, WSL Player of the Month (September 2021), resulting in the record (tie) for Most Player of the Month awards (3), PFA WSL Fan's Player of the Month (November 2021), and Arsenal Goal of the Month which includes contenders from both the men's and women's teams, January 2022.

2022–23: WSL all-time second-most goal contributions and ACL injury
In October 2022, after her successful UEFA Women's Euro 2022 campaign, Mead revealed it was her mother's terminal ovarian cancer diagnosis in summer 2021 that fuelled her acclaimed performance last season. She said, "It made me look at life a lot differently. My mum's now having a lot of her life taken away from her from this disease. I don't think you can waste time anymore worrying about things that are not worth worrying about." When the family was unsure if she would even be alive by the time Mead played in a home Euros, Mead made the conscious decision to "strip it all back" and just go out and play with freedom and youthful abandon. She said, "My motivation was my mum. … I wanted to make her proud. I wanted to make her happy." She said that she had spent all year "trying to put a smile on my mum's face."

Mead became second in WSL all-time goal contributions (93) with 54 goals and 39 assists on 16 September 2022.

Mead was named PFA Fan's Player of the Month and Arsenal Player of the Month for September 2022 after she scored three goals and assisted two in two games. On 19 October 2022, she was named Player of the Match in Arsenal's historic 5–1 win over the Champions League holders Lyon. She scored two goals and assisted one. Lyon are eight-time winners of the Champions League. It is the first time they have conceded five goals since May 2005. They had previously not lost by more than a single goal in the Champions League since 2009 and this was only their second defeat in 83 home games.

On 19 November 2022, Mead suffered a ruptured anterior cruciate ligament (ACL) in a league game and faced months out of the game. She called for more research into ACL injuries in women's football as 25% of 2022 Ballon d'Or nominees are currently out with the injury: Alexia Putellas (No. 1), herself (No. 2), Catarina Macario (No. 9), Vivianne Miedema (No. 11), and Marie-Antoinette Katoto (No. 17). On 16 December 2022, she signed a new contract at Arsenal, saying: "This club is home for me. I love playing for Arsenal, I love where I am and I love my family away from family here." So far, she has scored 61 goals in 166 appearances for Arsenal.

Despite her injury, Mead created 64 chances in 2022, the second-most of any player in a single calendar year in WSL history. Furthermore, she was the top scorer (8) in all women's UEFA competition for club and country in 2022, tied with Aitana Bonmatí. She finished second for the IFFHS World's Best International Goalscorer, meaning that she has scored the second-most goals (15) in international matches for club and country in 2022. She finished runner-up for the ATA Football WSL Player of the Year 2022.

International career

2010–17: Youth
 
Mead has represented England at every age level from under-15.

Mead was a part of the England U19 team that won the silver at the 2013 UEFA Women's Under-19 Championship. She scored a brace in the semifinal. She won the silver ball.

Mead played in all three England U20 matches at the 2014 FIFA U-20 Women's World Cup where she scored a long-range goal against Mexico. The goal was voted as the third-best goal of the tournament.

2018: Senior debut
In April 2018, Mead made her debut for the senior England as a substitute in a 0–0 2019 FIFA Women's World Cup qualification draw with Wales in Southampton.

Mead started her first match in September 2018, scoring twice in England's 6–0 win over Kazakhstan in Pavlodar.

2019–20: World Cup and England Player of the Year finalist
Mead introduced herself to the rest of the world with two superbly-taken goals at England's triumphant 2019 SheBelieves Cup campaign in February 2019. During the opening game, she scored a "stunning" match-winning goal against Brazil. The finish was later affectionately named "crot" (cross-shot) and became her signature. A few days later, she scored in the team's 3–0 victory against Japan to seal the SheBelieves title.

On 9 April 2019, Mead scored the opening goal in the 36th minute against Spain in an eventual 2–1 win.

Mead started in the first two matches of the 2019 FIFA Women's World Cup in France. She provided the assist to Jodie Taylor's goal in the Lionesses' second group stage match against Argentina — a 1–0 win. After finishing first in Group D and defeating Cameroon 3–0 in the Round of 16, England faced Norway in the quarter-finals. In the match, Mead assisted Lucy Bronze's goal in the 57th minute as England won again by three goals to none. In the semi-final against defending champions the United States, Mead assisted Ellen White's equaliser in the first half, although England were ultimately defeated 2–1. The semi-final match ended up being the most watched programme on UK television in 2019 with 11.7 million viewers. She provided second-most assists (3) in the tournament. Thanks to her performance at the 2019 World Cup, Mead was shortlisted for England Player of the Year and named Yorkshire Post Sports Hero of 2019.
 
In October 2019, Mead scored England's game-winning goal against Portugal. She won the Player of the Match Award. Later that month, she created more chances than any other player during a 2–1 loss against Brazil in front of a record-breaking 29,238 fans at Riverside Stadium in Middlesbrough.

In February 2020, Mead was left off the squad for the 2020 SheBelieves Cup due to injury.

2021–22: Record-breaking European champion
On 23 October 2021, Mead scored her first international hat-trick in a 4–0 win against Northern Ireland in the 2023 World Cup qualification phase. Her hat-trick came within a fourteen-minute second-half spell. She became the first woman to score a hat-trick at Wembley for England.

On 30 November 2021, Mead had her second international hat-trick, as well as a hat-trick of assists as England defeated Latvia 20-0 in another World Cup qualifying match. This was England's biggest-ever win. Another World Cup qualifier on 8 April 2022 saw Mead score four goals in a 10–0 demolishing of North Macedonia.

On 24 June 2022, Mead scored a brace against reigning European champions and World Cup finalists the Netherlands as a half-time substitute. Her first goal came only 54 seconds after the Dutch missed a penalty when the match was tied at 1–1. Her goal put England ahead for the first time. She added her second and England's fifth when she twisted and turned past the Dutch defence in the box and finding the bottom corner. She won England's Player of the Match award. Her goals took her to 14 in the season for England, surpassing Jimmy Greaves' long-standing record of the most goals scored in a single season by an England player of either gender, when he scored 13 in the 1960-61 season.

UEFA Women's Euro 2022
At UEFA Women's Euro 2022 on home soil, Mead won the Golden Boot, as well as becoming the Player of the Tournament and top assist provider with 6 goals and 5 assists in 6 matches, helping England win the tournament. It was the Lionesses' first major trophy and the first win by an England senior-level team of either gender since 1966. She became the only English player of either gender to win both the Golden Boot and Player of the Tournament award at the Euros or World Cup. Her six goals tied the record for most goals ever scored in a single edition of the Women's Euro and most goals at a single major tournament by an England player of either gender. She was directly involved in half of England's goals at the tournament.

Besides scoring the most goals and assisting the most in the tournament, Mead created the most chances (16), completed the most crosses (15), had the highest crossing accuracy (57%) among players who attempted over 10 crosses, made the highest assists per 90 (1.00, over 20% of 2nd place) and won the most Player of the Match awards (2).

Mead scored the tournament's opening goal against Austria in a 1-0 win. Against Norway, she scored her fourth career international hat-trick and assisted a goal. Naming her the Player of the Match, the UEFA Technical Observer said: "She showed fast, strong dribbling and a real will to score. She was brave in one-on-ones and sent some great balls into the box, as well as scoring three herself." Her second goal of the match was selected as one of the top ten goals of the tournament. Against Northern Ireland, she scored a goal and assisted two to cap a run of scoring in every group stage match. In the semi-final against Sweden, she scored the first goal of the match against the run of play and provided 2 assists, leading England to the final. She was again named the Player of the Match and UEFA's Technical Observer panel praised her showing: "She was consistent and extremely hard-working on the right wing, constantly linking up play and making key passes. She took her crucial goal excellently. Her delivery, providing two assists for teammates, made it a supremely productive evening."

In total, Mead scored 20 goals and assisted 16 in 19 matches for England in the 2021–22 season, breaking Jimmy Greaves' aforementioned record.

2022–23: Post-Euros acclaim
Following her impressive performance at the Euro 2022, Mead was named BBC Women's Footballer of the Year, World Soccer World Player of the Year, England Player of the Year, and FSA Player of the Year; and finished runner-up for the Ballon d'Or, UEFA Player of the Year, IFFHS World's Best Player, and The Guardian 100 Best Footballers in the World. She is the only the second English footballer of either gender after Michael Owen in 2001 to win the World Soccer World Player of the Year award.The Daily Telegraph named her the best player in Europe in 2022. She was voted third in Fans' Footballer of the Year, ahead of prominent Premier League players such as Bukayo Saka, Erling Haaland, Kevin De Bruyne, and Harry Kane. She is the first and only women's footballer on the shortlist in awards' history. She made the final three-woman shortlist for Globe Soccer Awards Player of the Year and voted fourth in Goal 50 for the best female players in the world. She was selected in the IFFHS World Team 2022 and ATA Football World Team of the Year.

Mead was named BBC Sports Personality of the Year, one of the UK's longest-running and most prestigious awards, by a landslide. She is the first female footballer to win the award. It was the first time that a female footballer has appeared in the top three of the voting. She is only the sixth footballer to receive the accolade, with Bobby Moore, Paul Gascoigne, Michael Owen, David Beckham, and Ryan Giggs; and the first since 2009. She is the first Arsenal and former or current Sunderland player of either gender to win the award. She is the second out LGBTQ+ player to win the award, after John Curry in 1976. Speaking at the ceremony, Mead said: "This is for women's sport and for women's sport heading in the right direction, Let's keep pushing, girls. Let's keep doing the right thing." It was a historic night for British women's sports which saw female winners for the team (Lionesses), coach (Sarina Wiegman of Lionesses, the first woman to win the award) and young personality (Jessica Gadirova) awards all in the same year for the first time. Mead's back-to-back win with last year's honoree Emma Raducanu made them the first consecutive female winners since 1971–72. Her Arsenal teammates celebrated the award on the team bus after their win against FC Zurich in the 2022–23 Champions League and congratulated her via facetime.

Mead was named Sports Journalists' Association (SJA) Sportswoman of the Year, the oldest of their kind in Britain. She is the first footballer to win the award. She finished runner-up for the European Sportswoman of the Year awarded by the International Sports Press Association (AIPS). L'Équipe, a French sport newspaper, voted her ninth in L'Équipe Champion of Champions. She was the only Brit in the top 10. Sky Sports named her one of Sporting Superstars of 2022 alongside international stars such as Lionel Messi and Stephen Curry. She was named Yorkshire Sports Performer of 2022 and Yorkshire Young Achievers Personality of the Year. She was nominated for Sunday Times Sportswomen of the Year and BT Sport Action Woman of the Year.

Mead was appointed a Member of the Order of the British Empire (MBE) in the 2023 New Year Honours for her services to football.

In October 2022, Mead revealed that it was her mother's terminal ovarian cancer diagnosis that fueled the best season in career so far. She said, "It made me look at life a lot differently. My mum's now having a lot of her life taken away from her from this disease. I don't think you can waste time anymore worrying about things that are not worth worrying about." When the family was unsure if she would even be alive by the time Mead played in a home Euros, Mead made the conscious decision to "strip it all back" and just go out and play with freedom and youthful abandon. She said, "My motivation was my mum. … I wanted to make her proud. I wanted to make her happy." She said that she had spent all year "trying to put a smile on my mum's face."

Mead earned her 50th cap against Japan on 11 November 2022. She has scored 29 goals in all competitions for England, 12 more than any other member of the latest Lionesses' squad. She has been directly involved in 37 goals in 23 appearances under Sarina Wiegman (21 goals, 16 assists), 13 more than any other teammate.

Mead was the top scorer (8) in all women's UEFA competition for club and country in 2022, tied with Aitana Bonmatí. She finished second for the IFFHS World's Best International Goalscorer, meaning that she has scored the second-most goals (15) in international matches for the club and country in 2022.

Advocacy

Beth Mead scholarship
Whilst playing for Sunderland, Mead gained BA (Hons) in Sports Development from Teesside University. Inspired by her experience, Mead and her alma mater launched Beth Mead Scholarship in February 2022 to support dual career students who have the potential to reach professional, national or international level within women’s football.

Beth Mead scholars receive a bursary of £1,200, as well as bespoke sport science support to help them unlock their full potential. This includes strength and conditioning, physiotherapy, sport nutrition, sport psychology, biomechanical analysis and sport physiology from a team of experts at Teesside University.
In addition, scholars also receive one-to-one and group mentoring with Mead during their studies, as well as branded sports kits and gym membership.

We Play Strong
In February 2020, Mead joined #WePlayStrong, a social media campaign by UEFA. Launched in 2017, the campaign aims to increase participation levels among 13-17 year-old girls by shifting perceptions of women’s football. The series, which originally included professional footballers Lisa Evans, Sarah Zadrazil, Eunice Beckmann, Laura Feiersinger follows the daily lives of female professional footballers. Her fitness routines have been shared online as part of the #TrainAtHome series.

Women's football
In August 2022, Mead launched the Trainline 'Tenner off Match Day Travel' campaign, offering fans traveling to WSL fixtures £10 off rail travel.

In September 2022, Mead became McDonald's Fun Football ambassador, which aims to give every child, from every background, gender and ability, the opportunity to enjoy football for free. Since May 2022, the Fun Football programme saw a 60% increase in girls signing up following an exciting summer for the Lionesses.

Soon after UEFA Women's Euro 2022, the England players wrote an open letter to Rishi Sunak and Liz Truss, the candidates in the ongoing Conservative Party leadership election, in which they declared their "legacy and goal was to inspire a nation". They saw their victory "as only the beginning". The letter pointed out that only 63% of British girls could play football in school PE lessons and concluded: "We – the 23 members of the England Senior Women's EURO Squad – ask you to make it a priority to invest in girls' football in schools, so that every girl has the choice".

In October 2022, Mead was nominated for the European Diversity Awards Media Diversity Champion of the Year for promoting women in football.

Other
Mead is an ambassador for Ovarian Cancer Action. In January 2023, she started a fundraising campaign in honour of her mother to make ovarian cancer a survivable disease for everyone diagnosed. During the holiday season in 2022, she donated £1 from every Christmas card she sold to Ovarian Cancer Action.

In October 2021, Mead signed an open letter to the Prime Minister, calling for a kinder, fairer and more effective system for refugees in the UK. The letter, organized by the campaign coalition Together With Refugees, was published in the week the Nationality and Borders Bill is brought back to Parliament and states: "…We want Afghans and other people across the world fleeing persecution and violence to find safety here as they have in the past, no matter how they arrive."

Mead has advocated for Battersea Dogs & Cats Home, an animal rescue centre for dogs and cats. Battersea was featured in Sky Sports' Inside the WSL: Beth Mead Special in September 2022. In October 2022, she appeared in Battersea's Wear Blue for Rescue promotion video.

Mead has spoken openly about her sexuality, and hopes that by setting an example she can help bridge the gap between LGBTQ+ discussions in the men's game. She has been nominated for British LGBT Awards in 2020 and 2022.

Books
Mead published her autobiography Lioness: My Journey to Glory in November 2022, with a foreword by Ian Wright and an afterword by Jermain Defoe. It details her early life, her struggles with anxiety and self-belief, being dropped from Team GB squad for 2020 Tokyo Olympics, regaining her confidence under the guidance of Jonas Eidevall and Sarina Wiegman, her mother's terminal ovarian cancer diagnosis that fueled the best season of her career yet, England's triumphant Euros campaign, and her advocacy for gender and LGBT equality, particularly in football. It became a Sunday Times bestseller.

Mead's book for younger readers, Roar: A Football Hero’s Guide to Dreaming Big and Playing the Game You Love will be published in May 2023.

Personal life
In 2015, Mead won the first Yorkshire Open Egg Throwing Championships in her village, Hinderwell.

In October 2022, after her successful UEFA Women's Euro 2022 campaign, Mead revealed it was her mother's terminal ovarian cancer diagnosis in summer 2021 that fueled the best season in her career so far. She said, "It made me look at life a lot differently. My mum's now having a lot of her life taken away from her from this disease. I don't think you can waste time anymore worrying about things that are not worth worrying about." When the family was unsure if she would even be alive by the time Mead played in a home Euros, Mead made the conscious decision to "strip it all back" and just go out and play with freedom and youthful abandon. She said, "My motivation was my mum. … I wanted to make her proud. I wanted to make her happy." She said that she had spent all year "trying to put a smile on my mum's face." Mead's mother died on 7 January 2023.

Mead was previously in a relationship with then-Arsenal teammate Daniëlle van de Donk. She is currently in a relationship with Arsenal teammate Vivianne Miedema.

Mead is good friends with her former Arsenal teammate Jordan Nobbs. She used to look up to Nobbs as Nobbs was at the Middlesbrough Centre of Excellence in the age group above her and was known as a huge talent at England youth teams. Since Mead had a similar pathway to Nobbs—Middlesbrough Centre of Excellence, Sunderland, then Arsenal—, Mead has joked that she followed Nobbs.

Career statistics

Club

International

Scores and results list England's goal tally first, score column indicates score after each Mead goal.

Honours
Sunderland
Women's Super League 2: 2014
Women's Premier League: 2011–12, 2012–13
Women's Premier League Cup: 2011–12

Arsenal
Women's Super League: 2018–19
Women's FA Cup runners-up: 2017–18, 2020–21
Women's League Cup: 2017–18; runners-up: 2018–19, 2019–20
England

UEFA Women's Championship: 2022
Arnold Clark Cup: 2022
SheBelieves Cup: 2019

England U19
UEFA Women's Under-19 Championship runner-up: 2013
Individual
Ballon d'Or Féminin runner-up: 2021–22
UEFA Player of the Year runner-up: 2021–22
BBC Women's Footballer of the Year: 2022
FIFA FIFPRO Women's World 11: 2022
UEFA Women's Championship Player of the Tournament: 2022
UEFA Women's Championship Golden Boot: 2022
UEFA Women's Championship Top Assist Provider: 2022
UEFA Women's Championship Team of the Tournament: 2022
UEFA Women's Under-19 Championship Silver Boot: 2013
World Soccer World Player of the Year: 2022
The Guardian 100 Best Footballers in the World runner-up: 2022
IFFHS World's Best Player runner-up: 2022
IFFHS World Team: 2022
England Player of the Year: 2021–22
England Young Player of the Year: 2015, 2018
 WSL Player of the Season: 2015
 WSL Top Assist Provider: 2018–19, 2021–22
WSL Golden Boot: 2015
WPL Golden Boot: 2011–12, 2012–13
 WSL Goal of the Season: 2018–19
PFA Young Player of the Year: 2015–16
PFA Team of the Year: 2015–16, 2017–18
FSA Player of the Year: 2018, 2022
 North East FWA Player of the Year: 2015
Arsenal Player of the Season: 2021–22
Arsenal Supporters Club Player of the Season: 2017–18, 2021–22
Sunderland Forward of the Decade: 2011–2020
Sunderland Team of the Decade: 2011–2020
Sunderland Player of the Year: 2011–12, 2012–13, 2015–16
 WSL Player of the Month: March 2019, April 2019, September 2021
 PFA Fan's Player of the Month: November 2021, September 2022

Media
BBC Sports Personality of the Year: 2022
 AIPS European Sportswoman of the Year runner-up: 2022
SJA Sportswoman of the Year: 2022
 Yorkshire Young Achievers Personality of the Year: 2022
 Yorkshire Sports Performer of the Year: 2022
Yorkshire Post Sports Hero of the Year: 2019
 Scarborough and District Sports Awards 
 Top Female Achiever: 2013, 2014, 2015 
 Mavis Clayton Memorial Trophy for Outstanding Achievement: 2012
SportsByte Sports Person of the Year: 2014, 2015

State and civic honours
Member of the Order of the British Empire (MBE) for services to association football: 2023 New Year Honours
Freedom of the City of London: 2022
Records
Continental
 Most goals in a single edition of the UEFA Women's Championship: 6 (2022)

England
 Most goals for England in a season by either gender: 20 (2021–22)
 First English player of either gender to win both the Golden Boot and Player of the Tournament at the Euros or World Cup (UEFA Women's Euro 2022)
 Most goals at a single major tournament by an England player of either gender: 6 (UEFA Women's Euro 2022)
 First woman to score a hat-trick at Wembley for England ( vs Northern Ireland)

Women's Super League
 All-time most assists: 42
 All-time second-most goal contributions: 97
 Most assists in a season: 12 (2018–19)
 Most chances created in a season: 72 (2021–22)
 Most chances created from open play in a season: 54+ (2021–22)
 First player to create 50 open play chances in a single season (2021–22)
 Second-most chances created in a calendar year: 46 (2022) 
 Youngest Golden Boot winner: 20 (2015)
 Most goals in the first ten games for a club: 11 (2015)
 Most Player of the Month awards: 3 (March 2019, April 2019, September 2021)
 Second-fastest hat-trick: 18 minutes ( vs Chelsea)
 Most combined goals between two players: 22 (with Vivianne Miedema)

Other
 First women's footballer to win the BBC Sports Personality of the Year Award (2022)
 First Arsenal and former or current Sunderland player of either gender to win the BBC Sports Personality of the Year Award (2022)
 Second out LGBTQ+ player to win the BBC Sports Personality of the Year Award (2022)
 Second English footballer of either gender to win the World Soccer World Player of the Year award. (2022)
 First footballer to win the SJA Sportswoman of the Year award (2022)
 First women's footballer to be shortlisted in Fans' Footballer of the Year (2022)

See also
 List of FA WSL hat-tricks
 FA WSL records and statistics
 List of England women's international footballers

References

External links

 Profile at the Arsenal F.C. website
 Profile at the Football Association website
 
 
 

Living people
1995 births
People from Whitby
Sportspeople from North Yorkshire
English women's footballers
Sunderland A.F.C. Ladies players
Women's association football forwards
Women's Super League players
England women's under-23 international footballers
FA Women's National League players
Footballers from North Yorkshire
Arsenal W.F.C. players
England women's international footballers
2019 FIFA Women's World Cup players
Alumni of Teesside University
LGBT association football players
English LGBT sportspeople
21st-century LGBT people
UEFA Women's Euro 2022 players
UEFA Women's Championship-winning players
English autobiographers
Women autobiographers
Members of the Order of the British Empire
Association footballers' wives and girlfriends